Mongoose refers to two types of carnivorous mammals.

Mongoose or The Mongoose may also refer to:

Personal nickname
Tom McEwen (drag racer) (1937-2018), American drag racer nicknamed "The Mongoose", 
Adam Rose (born 1979), South African professional wrestler commonly called "The Radical Mongoose", also shortened to "The Mongoose"
 Henry John Temple, 3rd Viscount Palmerston (1784–1865), British Prime Minister nicknamed "The Mongoose"

Brands and enterprises
 Mongoose (bicycles), a brand name of bicycles produced by Pacific Cycle
 Mongoose Publishing, British manufacturer of role-playing books, pewter miniatures, and card games

Fictional characters
 Mongoose (comics), a supervillain appearing in comic books published by Marvel Comics
 The Mongoose, a hitman in the graphic novel XIII
 The Mongoose, a pulp fiction character created by Johnston McCulley (1883–1958)

Military
 Agusta A129 Mangusta ("Mongoose"), attack helicopter
 , a Dutch brig captured by the Royal Navy in 1799 or 1800

Technology
 Mongoose (web server)
 Mongoose, an application development platform created and distributed by Infor
 Armstrong Siddeley Mongoose, a British aero engine developed in the 1920s
 Mongoose-V, a series of 32-bit computer processors used for NASA satellites
 Mongoose (MongoDB), a JavaScript library for programming in Node.js

Other uses
 Cuban Project, also known as Operation Mongoose, a covert CIA operation against Fidel Castro
 Mongoose Cricket Bat, a cricket bat for 20/20 games

See also